The 2012 Lenox Industrial Tools 301 was a NASCAR Sprint Cup Series stock car race held on July 15, 2012 at New Hampshire Motor Speedway in Loudon, New Hampshire, United States. Contested over 301 laps, it was the nineteenth race of the 2012 NASCAR Sprint Cup Series season. Kasey Kahne of Hendrick Motorsports took his second win of the season, while Denny Hamlin finished second and Clint Bowyer finished third.

Report

Background

New Hampshire Motor Speedway is one of ten intermediate tracks to hold NASCAR races; the others are Atlanta Motor Speedway, Charlotte Motor Speedway, Chicagoland Speedway, and Darlington Raceway as well as Homestead Miami Speedway, Kansas Speedway, Kentucky Speedway, Las Vegas Motor Speedway, and Texas Motor Speedway. The track's turns are banked from two to seven degrees, while the front stretch, the finish line, and the back stretch are banked at one degree.

Before the race, Matt Kenseth led the Drivers' Championship with 676 points, and Dale Earnhardt Jr. stood in second with 651. Greg Biffle was third in the Drivers' Championship with 632, fourteen points ahead of Jimmie Johnson and forty ahead of Tony Stewart in fourth and fifth. Kevin Harvick, with 586, was two points ahead of Denny Hamlin, as Martin Truex Jr. with 584 points, was eleven ahead of Brad Keselowski and twelve in front of Clint Bowyer. In the Manufacturers' Championship, Chevrolet was leading with 126 points, twenty-two points ahead of Toyota. Ford, with 90 points, was fourteen points ahead of Dodge in the battle for third. Ryan Newman is the defending race winner after winning the event in 2011.

Shortly before the 2012 Coke Zero 400, held one week earlier, NASCAR announced that A. J. Allmendinger failed a random drug test held on June 29, 2012, and that he was suspended temporarily, depending on the result of his second test. Afterward, Penske Racing announced that Sam Hornish Jr., who replaced him in the Coke Zero 400, would also replace him for a second consecutive week.

Practice and qualifying

Three practice sessions were held before the Sunday race—one on Friday, July 13, and two on Saturday, July 14. The first session lasted 90 minutes, and the second was 55 minutes. The third and final session was 60 minutes.  Kyle Busch was quickest with a time of 28.555 seconds in the first session, less than one tenth of a second faster than Biffle. Kurt Busch was just off Biffle's pace, followed by Kasey Kahne, Paul Menard, and Truex Jr.. Brian Vickers was seventh, still within two tenths of a second of Kyle Busch's time.

Forty-four cars were entered for qualifying, but only forty-three could qualify for the race because of NASCAR's qualifying procedure. Kyle Busch clinched the ninth pole position of his career, with a time of 28.548 seconds. He was joined on the front row of the grid by Kahne. Hamlin qualified third, Truex Jr. took fourth, and Bowyer started fifth. Newman, Johnson, Jeff Gordon, Earnhardt Jr. and Stewart rounded out the top ten. The driver that failed to qualify for the race was Mike Bliss. Once the qualifying session concluded, Kyle Busch expressed his happiness with qualifying: "Excellent lap, just tried to hit the same marks in practice. Haven't found the magic way to get around the Magic Mile but today we did."

In the second practice session, Hamlin was quickest with a time of 28.969 seconds. Gordon, with a time of 28.993, was second-quickest, ahead of Truex Jr., Aric Almirola, and Bowyer. Kahne, Johnson, Kyle Busch, Vickers, and Jeff Burton completed the first ten positions. Hamlin continued to be quickest through the third practice session with a time of 28.990, 0.009 seconds faster than his fastest lap during the second session. Kyle Busch was second-quickest in the session, while Keselowski was scored third. Bowyer followed in the fourth position ahead of Johnson, Vickers and Truex Jr. Kahne, Logano and Carl Edwards rounded out the first ten positions in eighth, ninth and tenth, respectively.

Race

The race, the nineteenth in the season, began with Kyle Busch on the Pole and Kasey Kahne starting second, not much happened here but three cautions, two for debris and one for David Reutimann's blown engine, Kyle Busch, the races polesitter had a speeding penalty which would cause him to finish 16th, Kasey Kahne won the race on lap 301 of a scheduled 301.

Results

Qualifying

Race results

Standings after the race

Drivers' Championship standings

Manufacturers' Championship standings

Note: Only the top five positions are included for the driver standings.

References

NASCAR races at New Hampshire Motor Speedway
Lenox Industrial Tools 301
Lenox Industrial Tools 301
Lenox Industrial Tools 301